The 1999 elections in India include the 1999 Indian general election, Rajya Sabha election and various State Assembly elections.

General election

Legislative Assembly elections

Rajya Sabha election 

1999 elections in India
India
1999 in India
Elections in India by year